Ololygon rizibilis is a species of frog in the family Hylidae.
It is endemic to Brazil.
Its natural habitats are subtropical or tropical moist lowland forests and intermittent freshwater marshes.
It is threatened by habitat loss.

References

rizibilis
Endemic fauna of Brazil
Amphibians described in 1964
Taxonomy articles created by Polbot